Joyce Wambui Njuguna (born 17 April 1976) is a Kenyan powerlifter. She competed in the women's +61 kg event at the 2014 Commonwealth Games where she won a bronze medal. She also competed at the Commonwelath Games in 2018, where she came 3rd in the women's heavyweight but did not receive a medal as there were four overall competitors, and in 2022 where she came 5th in the women's heavyweight event.

References 

1976 births
Living people
Kenyan female weightlifters
Commonwealth Games bronze medallists for Kenya
Female powerlifters
Commonwealth Games medallists in weightlifting
Powerlifters at the 2014 Commonwealth Games
Powerlifters at the 2022 Commonwealth Games
Powerlifters at the 2018 Commonwealth Games
Medallists at the 2014 Commonwealth Games